Kazimierowo may refer to the following places:
Kazimierowo, Greater Poland Voivodeship (west-central Poland)
Kazimierowo, Kuyavian-Pomeranian Voivodeship (north-central Poland)
Kazimierowo, Podlaskie Voivodeship (north-east Poland)